Jean-Joseph is a given name. Notable people with the name include:

Jean Joseph Marie Amiot (1718–1793), French Jesuit missionary
Jean-Joseph Ange d'Hautpoul (1754–1807), French cavalry general of the Napoleonic wars
Jean-Joseph Ansiaux (1764–1840), historical and portrait painter
Jean-Joseph Balechou (1715–1765), French engraver
Jean-Joseph Benjamin-Constant (1845–1902), French painter and etcher
Jean-Joseph-Xavier Bidauld (1758–1846), French painter
Jean Joseph Charles Louis Blanc (1811–1882), French politician and historian
Jean Joseph Bott (1826–1895), German violinist and composer
Jean-Joseph Carriès (1855–1894), French sculptor, ceramist, and miniaturist
Jean-Joseph Casot (1728–1800), Jesuit, came from France to Canada in 1757 as a lay brother
Jean-Joseph Chapuis (1765–1864), French cabinetmaker of the 18th and 19th centuries
Jean-Joseph Charlier (1794–1886), Belgian revolutionary
Jean Joseph Jacques Chretien (born 1934), PC, OM, CC, QC, 20th Prime Minister of Canada
Jean Joseph Antoine de Courvoisier (1775–1835), French magistrate and politician
Jean-Joseph Dassy, a French historical and portrait painter and lithographer
Jean Joseph Delambre (1749–1822), French mathematician and astronomer
Jean-Joseph Denis (1876–1960), lawyer, judge and political figure in Quebec
Jean-Joseph, Marquis Dessolles (1767–1828), French statesman
Jean Joseph Dussault (1769–1824), French librarian
Jean-Joseph Espercieux (1757–1840), French sculptor
Jean-Joseph-Alexandre Falguière (1831–1900), French sculptor and painter
Jean Joseph Frédéric Adolphe Farre (1816–1887), French general and statesman
Jean-Joseph Fiocco (1686–1746), Flemish (Belgian) composer of the high and late Baroque period
Jean-Joseph Foucou (1739–1821), French sculptor
Jean-Joseph Gaume (1802–1879), French Roman Catholic theologian and author
Jean-Joseph Languet de Gergy (1677–1753), French ecclesiastic and theologian
Jean-Joseph Sourbader de Gimat, volunteer French officer in the Continental Army during the American Revolutionary War
Jean-Joseph Girouard (1794–1855), notary and political figure in Lower Canada
Jean Joseph Guieu (1758–1817), joined the French royal army and quickly rose in rank during the French Revolutionary Wars
Jean-Joseph Hirth (1854–1931), Catholic Bishop in German East Africa, known as the founder of the church in Rwanda
Jean Joseph Hubert (1765–1805), French Navy officer and captain
Jean Joseph Amable Humbert (1767–1823), French soldier, a participant in the French Revolution
Jean Joseph Jacotot (1770–1840), French teacher and educational philosopher
Jean Joseph Marie Auguste Jaures (1859–1914), French Socialist leader
Ernst Jean-Joseph (born 1948), Haitian football midfielder
Jimmy Jean-Joseph (born 1972), former French athlete who specialised in the 800 meters
Leverrier, Urbain Jean Joseph (1811–1877), French mathematician who specialized in celestial mechanics
Napoleon Eugene Louis Jean Joseph (1856–1879), Prince Imperial, Fils de France
Jean-Joseph de Laborde, marquis de Laborde (1724–1794), French politician
Jean Joseph Etienne Lenoir (1822–1900), Belgian engineer who developed the internal combustion engine in 1858
Jean-Joseph Loiseaux (1815–1904), known as Piatus of Mons, French theologian and Capuchin
Etienne-Jean-Joseph-Alexandre MacDonald (1765–1840), Marshal of France, military leader during the French Revolutionary and Napoleonic Wars
Jean-Joseph Marcel (1776–1854), French printer and engineer
Édouard Jean Joseph de Laborde de Marchainville (1762–1786), French explorer and naval officer
Jean Joseph Martin (1837–1910), French Archetier / Bowmaker
Gabriel Jean Joseph Molitor (1770–1849), Marshal of France
Jean-Joseph de Mondonville (1711–1772), French violinist and composer
Jean-Joseph Monnard (1901–1973), French ice hockey player
Jean Joseph Mounier (1758–1806), French politician and judge
Jean-Joseph Mouret (1682–1738), French composer
Jean-Joseph Perraud (1819–1876), French academic sculptor
Jean-Joseph Petit-Didier (born 1659), French Benedictine theologian and ecclesiastical historian
Jean Joseph Magdeleine Pijon (1758–1799), French general killed in combat during the French Revolutionary Wars
Jean Joseph François Poujoulat (1808–1880), French historian and journalist
Jean Joseph Rabearivelo (1901–1937), widely considered to be Africa's first modern poet
Jean-Joseph Raepsaet (1750–1832), Belgian politician and historian
Jean-Joseph Raikem (1787–1875), Roman Catholic Belgian politician, president of the National Congress of Belgium
Jean-Joseph Regnault (1834–1894), French economist
Jean-Joseph Renaud (1873–1953), French fencer
Jean-Joseph Rodolphe (1730–1812), Alsatian horn player, violinist and composer
Jean Joseph Rolette (1781–1842), fur trader and member of the Mackinac Company
Jean-Joseph Patu de Rosemont (1767–1818), French painter
Jean Joseph Seznec (1905–1983), historian and mythographer
Jean-Joseph Sue (1710–1792), French surgeon and anatomist
Jean-Joseph Surin (1600–1665), French Jesuit mystic, preacher, devotional writer and exorcist
Jean-Joseph Taillasson (1745–1809), French history painter and portraitist, draftsman and art critic
Jean-Joseph-François Tassaert (1765–1835), French painter and engraver
Jean-Joseph Thonissen (born 1817), professor of law at the Catholic University of Leuven
Jean Joseph Henri Toussaint (1847–1890), French veterinarian born in Rouvres-la-Chétive, department of Vosges
Jean-Joseph Trestler (1757–1813), German-born businessman, land owner and political figure in Lower Canada
Jean Joseph Vaudechamp (1790–1866), French painter born in Rambervillers, Vosges
Jean-Joseph Vinache (1696–1754), French sculptor

See also 
 Jean (male given name)
 Joseph

French masculine given names
Compound given names